All the Brothers Were Valiant is a 1923 American silent sea adventure and romantic drama film starring Lon Chaney. The film was produced and distributed by Metro Pictures corporation and directed by Irvin Willat. The cast also features Malcolm McGregor, Billie Dove and Robert McKim. The screenplay was written by Julien Josephson, based on the eponymous novel by Ben Ames Williams. The film was also known as Cold Courage.

All the Brothers Were Valiant was remade by MGM as Across to Singapore in 1928 with Ernest Torrance playing Chaney's role, and in 1953 again as All the Brothers Were Valiant with Stewart Granger in the Chaney role. A still exists on the internet showing Chaney as Mark Shore, and another showing the mutiny scene. Chaney disliked his co-stars on this film, calling Malcolm McGregor a "dumb bell" and saying of Billie Dove "she's all beauty and no brains".

Portions of it were shot on location in San Francisco. Two real whaling ships were used in the making of the film,  the 65-foot Port Saunders and the  165-foot Carolyn Frances.  The film is now considered lost, destroyed in the 1965 MGM vault fire. (A 2-minute fragment is said to exist in a Netherlands museum.)

Plot
Mark Shore (Lon Chaney), the elder brother of Joel (McGregor), was captain of a whaling schooner called the "Nathan Ross", but when his ship returned to port from a trip to the Gilbert Islands, he was no longer aboard. Joel, who was working on another ship at the time, asks to be transferred to his brother's ship for a 3-year sojourn so that he can try to locate him. The request is granted and Joel takes his brother's place on the "Nathan Ross".

Before he sets sail, he marries Priscilla Holt (Dove) and takes his bride with him on the journey. While his family history shows that all of their men-folk were brave and courageous, Priscilla thinks that her husband is really a coward at heart. Priscilla rapidly gets bored with sailing, and the smell of cooking whale blubber makes her sick to her stomach.

Joel finds his brother Mark who suddenly hops aboard the ship one night as it rounds Cape Horn. Mark explains that he was drinking heavily that night and the ship left port without him. Mark makes advances toward Joel's wife, and she complains to her husband. Mark tries to get Joel to change course and go with him to retrieve a cache of valuable pearls that he hid on an island, but Joel refuses. Mark incites the crew to mutiny by spreading rumors of the hidden treasure. Joel keeps order for a while but is soon overpowered and tied up. Aaron Burnham, the ship's carpenter, remains loyal to Joel and manages to release him from captivity.

Mark realizes his mistake and tries to call off the mutiny, but in the melee, he is hit on the head and falls into the sea. Joel jumps in and tries to rescue him, but Mark disappears below the surface before he can reach him. The mutiny is quelled and Priscilla realizes her husband is a true hero after all. At the end, Joel writes in the ship's logbook "All the brothers were valiant."

Cast
 Malcolm McGregor as Joel Shore
 Billie Dove as Priscilla Holt
 Lon Chaney as Mark Shore
 William Orlamond as Aaron Burnham, the ship's carpenter
 Robert McKim as Finch
 Bob Kortman as Vorde
 Otto Brower as Morrell
 Curt Rehfeld as Hooper
 William V. Mong as the Cook
 Leo Willis as Tom
 Shannon Day as The Brown Girl (Mark's native girlfriend)
 Ted Billings as Crew Member
 Gwendolynne D'Amour

Critical Comments
"Metro has converted Ben Ames Williams' story into a splendid sea picture.... It is an attraction that will be enthusiastically received by men, and because of its romantic interest will appeal to many women...Lon Chaney gives the most striking performance of the production. As the bragging husky of the seas, he is most convincing and gets a slightly humorous meaning out of his role. The character is a particularly human one."---Moving Picture World

"It is one of the best sea pictures that has come on the screen recently and should give entire satisfaction wherever shown. Lon Chaney is excellent as Mark Shore, the elder brother." ---Exhibitors Trade Review

"This is a whaling good story, though over long. Most of the action is on board ship, and there is some good saltwater atmosphere. Both of the brothers are valiant. Malcolm McGregor is a likeable hero. And the other, Lon Chaney, is most villainous!" ---Photoplay

"A delightful adventurous tale of the water..... The picture is a first rate entertainment of its kind and should please a great many. Lon Chaney gives his usual splendid performance." ---Film Daily

References

External links

 
 
 
 
 Lobby poster to the film

1920s adventure drama films
1923 romantic drama films
American adventure drama films
American romantic drama films
American silent feature films
American black-and-white films
Lost American films
Films based on American novels
Films directed by Irvin Willat
Metro Pictures films
1923 lost films
1923 films
Lost romantic drama films
Treasure hunt films
1920s American films
Silent romantic drama films
Silent adventure films
Silent American drama films